The 2017 NYC season is the 10th season of under 20s rugby league in Australia.

Regular season

Bold – Opposition's Home game
X – Bye
* – Golden point game
Opponent for round listed above margin

Round 1

Round 2

Round 3

Round 4

Round 5

Round 6

Round 7

Round 8

Round 9

Round 10

Round 11

Round 12

Round 13

Round 14

Round 15

Round 16

Round 17

Round 18

Round 19

Round 20

Round 21

Round 22

Round 23

Round 24

Round 25

Round 26

Finals Series

Chart

References

Results